Aldealpozo is a municipality located in the province of Soria, in the autonomous region Castile and León, in Spain. As of 2018 it had a population of 18 people.

References

Municipalities in the Province of Soria